Alveolar rhabdomyosarcoma (ARMS) is a subtype of the rhabdomyosarcoma soft tissue cancer family whose lineage is from mesenchymal cells and are related to skeletal muscle cells. ARMS tumors resemble the alveolar tissue in the lungs. Tumor location varies from patient to patient, but is commonly found in the head and neck region, male and female urogenital tracts, the torso, and extremities. Two fusion proteins can be associated with ARMS, but are not necessary, PAX3-FKHR (now known as FOXO1). and PAX7-FKHR. In children and adolescents ARMS accounts for about 1 percent of all malignancies, has an incidence rate of 1 per million, and most cases occur sporadically with no genetic predisposition. PAX3-FOXO1 is now known to drive cancer-promoting gene expression programs through creation of distant genetic elements called super enhancers.

Genetics  
There is no genetic predisposition for developing ARMS, but there are a few genetic recombination events that occurs to cause the fusion protein to be synthesized. In order to have the PAX3-FOXO1 fusion there needs to be a recombination event that translocates part of chromosome 13 to chromosome 2, and for PAX7-FOXO1 fusion there must be a translocation of part of chromosome 13 to chromosome 1. The 2;13 translocation reciprocal is often balanced and not amplified, while the 1;13 translocation reciprocal is sometimes viewed as balanced and sometimes not, so it is often amplified. The PAX7-FOXO1 fusion is often amplified in tumors (about 70 percent of all PAX7-FOXO1 fusion positive tumors) and the PAX3-FOXO1 fusion is rarely amplified (only in 5 percent of all PAX3-FOXO1 fusion positive tumors). About 60 percent of all ARMS cases are positive for PAX3-FOXO1 fusion gene, 20 percent are positive for PAX7-FOXO1 fusion gene, and the remaining 20 percent are fusion negative ARMS cases. Both fusion genes are composed of either the PAX3 or PAX7 DNA binding domains and the FOXO1 transactivation domain. This fusion causes a dysregulation of transcription and acts as an oncogene promoting cancer formation.

Pathology 
ARMS cells are often small with little cytoplasm. The nuclei of the cells are round with normal, dull, chromatin structures. The ARMS cells often clump together and have fibrovascular septae that interrupts the aggregates. The fibrovascular septae that disrupts the aggregates often give the tumor the physiology of the alveoli found in the lungs. In a few cases, there may not be any fibrovascular septae and this gives the tumor a more solid phenotype and no alveoli physiology. Immunostaining for myogenin and for MyoD can be used to determine ARMS from other rhabdomyosarcoma tumors and immunostaining for AP2β and p-cadherin can distinguish fusion positive ARMS from fusion negative.

Embryonic origin and epidemiology 
ARMS usually occurs in the skeletal muscles and is postulated to be derived from precursor cells within the muscle tissue. During embryonic development ARMS occurs in the mesoderm which is the precursor for the skeletal muscle tissue. ARMS accounts for roughly 20 to 30 percent of all rhabdomyosarcoma tumors and therefore accounts for roughly 1 percent of malignancies found in children and adolescents. There is an age determination on which PAX proteins fuse together with the FOXO1 transcription factor. PAX3-FOXO1 positive subset of ARMS occurs mostly in older children and young adults, while PAX7-FOXO1 positive subset of ARMS and fusion negative subsets occur most often in younger children.

Clinical 
ARMS usually occurs in the skeletal muscle tissue of the extremities, but it is still very common in the torso, head, and neck regions. The primary tumor often presents itself as a soft mass of tissue that is painless, but the tumor can be detected if it starts to put pressure on other structures in the primary site. A large fraction of patients who are diagnosed with ARMS, roughly 25–30 percent, will have metastases at the time of diagnosis. The standard sites for metastases to form are the bone marrow, the bones, and distal nodes. Typical treatment options for patients who have been diagnosed with ARMS include standard surgery, radiation therapy, and intensive chemotherapy.

Prognosis 
Patients who have been diagnosed with ARMS often have poor outcomes. The four year survival rate without remission for local ARMS tumors is 65 percent, while the four year survival rate with metastatic ARMS is only 15 percent. Patients who have metastatic ARMS positive with PAX3-FOXO1 fusion often have a poorer outcome than patients positive with PAX7-FOXO1 fusion, with a four-year survival rate of 8 percent and 75 percent respectively. Other variables affect the four year survival rate, such as primary tumor site, size of primary tumor, amount of local invasion, number of distal lymph nodes spread to, and whether metastasis has occurred. Prognosis for patients who have primary tumor sites within the bones often have higher survival rates and respond well to treatment options. While patients who have primary tumor sites within the nasopharynx region with metastases to the breast have very poor outcomes. Patients who are fusion protein negative with low risk clinical features should be treated with reduced therapy, while patients who are fusion protein positive with low risk clinical features should be treated as an intermediate risk and have more intensive therapy regimens.

See also
 FOXO genes
 Oncology
 Pax genes

References

External links 

Sarcoma